Leave It Open may refer to:

Leave It Open, a 1981 album by the jazz rock band Pierre Moerlen's Gong
"Leave It Open", a song by Kate Bush from her 1982 album The Dreaming